Darren William Burnett (born 27 May 1976 in Arbroath, is a Scottish lawn bowler and indoor bowler.

Bowls career

Commonwealth Games
At the 2014 Commonwealth Games, he won a gold medal in men's singles after defeating Canada's Ryan Bester. In 2018 he was selected as part of the Scottish team for the 2018 Commonwealth Games on the Gold Coast in Queensland where he claimed another gold medal in the Triples with Ronnie Duncan and Derek Oliver.

In 2022, he competed in the men's triples and the men's fours at the 2022 Commonwealth Games.

World Championships
He has won four medals at the World Bowls Championship. The first came during the 2008 World Outdoor Bowls Championship in Christchurch when he won a silver medal and then four years later won a gold and bronze during the 2012 World Outdoor Bowls Championship in the pairs and triples. The fourth medal was in the singles at the 2016 World Outdoor Bowls Championship in Christchurch. In 2020 he was selected for the 2020 World Outdoor Bowls Championship in Australia.

World Indoor Championships
He has a good record indoors and was the singles world champion in 2014. Burnett enjoyed a very successful 2016 World Indoor Bowls Championship after securing both the Open Pairs title with Stewart Anderson and the Mixed Pairs title with Katherine Rednall. Burnett claimed a fourth title when winning the open pairs for the second time with Stewart Anderson in 2022.

Nationals
Burnett holds the Scottish National Men's Singles Championship record equally with Robert Sprot, David Dall and Joseph Black, with three titles which he won in 1999, 2002, 2005. He subsequently won the singles at the British Isles Bowls Championships in 2003 and 2006.

Other events
Other major wins include winning the World Singles Champion of Champions in 2006, the 1991 & 2001 Scottish International Open, the 2008 International Open, the 2010 Welsh International Open.

Personal life
He works as a policeman in Arbroath, Scotland and is married with two children.

References

External links
 
 
 
 

1965 births
Living people
Scottish male bowls players
Scottish sportsmen
Commonwealth Games medallists in lawn bowls
Commonwealth Games gold medallists for Scotland
Bowls players at the 2014 Commonwealth Games
Bowls players at the 2018 Commonwealth Games
Bowls players at the 2022 Commonwealth Games
Bowls World Champions
Indoor Bowls World Champions
People from Arbroath
Sportspeople from Angus, Scotland
Scottish police officers
Medallists at the 2014 Commonwealth Games
Medallists at the 2018 Commonwealth Games